Polotsk District is a second-level administrative subdivision (raion) of Belarus in the Vitebsk Region.

References

Districts of Vitebsk Region